Dragojlović is a Serbian surname, a patronymic derived from the Slavic masculine given name Dragojlo. It may refer to:

Vladislav Dragojlović (b. 1979), Serbian basketball player
Sreten Dragojlović, former Yugoslav basketball player
Nebojša Dragojlović, Serbian drummer in Kazna Za Uši
Dragoljub Dragojlović, historian
Mladen Dragojlović, Civil Engineer

See also
Dragojlić, surname

Serbian surnames